Karlovy Vary Airport  is the airport of Karlovy Vary in western Bohemia. It is located in the village of Olšová Vrata, 6 km southeast of the city centre and is the fourth-busiest airport in the Czech Republic. The airport handled 104,469 passengers in 2013, which was a record high.

History
Plans were announced in 2011 to build a new departure hall at the airport, at an estimated expense of 30 million crowns. 99% of passengers using the airport in 2012 were Russian.

Airlines and destinations
The following airlines operate regular scheduled and charter flights at Karlovy Vary Airport:

Statistics

Ground transportation 
From Karlovy Vary or Prague: The airport is 6 km southeast of the centre of Karlovy Vary. Turn from the road I/6 (E48) near Karlovy Vary Golf Resort and continue 3,5 km to the airport. Public transport to the airport is maintained seven times per day by city bus Nr. 8. The nearest major international airport is Prague Václav Havel Airport approx. 90 km to the east.

See also
 List of airports in Czech Republic

References

External links 

 
 
 

Airports in the Czech Republic
Buildings and structures in Karlovy Vary
International airports in the Czech Republic
1929 establishments in Czechoslovakia
Airports established in 1929
20th-century architecture in the Czech Republic